Margarita Province (1525 - 1864) was one of the provinces of the Spanish Empire, then one of the provinces of Gran Colombia, and later one of the Provinces of Venezuela. In Gran Colombia it belonged to the Orinoco Department which was created in 1824. With the creation of the States of Venezuela in 1864 it became Nueva Esparta.

Divisions
The Province was named for its most important part, Isla Margarita.

Capital: Asunción.

Cantons: 
 Asunción Canton
 Norte Canton (seat: Santa Ana del Norte).

Governors
A partial list of governors:

References
Citations

Sources

 

[12]Archivo General de Indias, CONTRATACIÓN, 5469, Nº 2, R54

Provinces of Gran Colombia
Provinces of Venezuela
Provinces of the Spanish Empire
Colonial Venezuela
1525 establishments in New Spain